Ningxia Medical University (NXMU), previously known as Ningxia Medical College, is a medical school located in Yinchuan City, Ningxia Province, China.

See also
 List of medical schools in China
 List of universities and colleges in Ningxia

References

External links
Official website of Ningxia Medical University
English website of Ningxia Medical University
Ningxia-Medical-University-China

Universities and colleges in Ningxia
Education in Yinchuan
Medical schools in China